Ibrahim Obreh Kargbo (born 10 April 1982) is a Sierra Leonean former football player. He ended his career with a suspension over match-fixing.

Career 
Former teams are Old Edwardians F.C., Feyenoord Rotterdam, RWD Molenbeek, Sporting Charleroi, Malatyaspor, FC Brussels and Willem II. During his time at Willem II he was a key player. He played more than 100 matches for the Dutch side and then moved to FC Baku when his contract had expired. In August 2013, he joined his former team Brussels but decided to terminate his contract a month later.

On 11 July 2014, Kargbo went on trial with Swindon Town along with Elikem Amenku after his release from West Bromwich Albion, although he did not sign for the club. Instead, Kargbo signed for Atlético. He later played for Barkingside and Thamesmead Town, before signing for Welling United in February 2016.

After making 10 appearances for Welling in their unsuccessful attempt to stay in the National League, Kargbo signed for Dulwich Hamlet of the Isthmian League Premier Division ahead of the 2016−17 season, going on to make 45 appearances and scoring 3 goals in all competitions in his first season at the club.

Position 
He plays as a defender or defensive midfielder.

International career 
Kargbo is first choice defender for the Sierra Leone national football team and he succeeded Mohamed Kallon as the Leone Stars' national team captain.

Legal trouble 

In July 2014, Kargbo was among 15 players and officials suspended from international football, along with Ibrahim Koroma, Samuel Barlay and Christian Caulker over allegations of match-fixing relating to an Africa Cup of Nations qualifier in 2008 against South Africa which ended 0–0.

Allegedly, he was also involved in match fixing during his time at Willem II, serving as the main contact for a gambling syndicate and selling them losses against AFC Ajax and Feyenoord; Kargbo has denied the allegations. His ban was lifted in 2015.

On 15 February 2016, however, the Royal Dutch Football Association reported it had found evidence of Kargbo being actively involved in match fixing, specifically in a match against FC Utrecht on 9 August 2009 (which Willem II lost 1–0). Kargbo is now banned from playing football in the Netherlands.

In April 2019, FIFA banned Kargbo for life from all footballing activities due to "match manipulation".

Personal life 
His son Ibrahim Kargbo Jr. is also a footballer.

Career statistics

References

External links 

Career statistics at Dulwich Hamlet F.C.

1982 births
Living people
Association football defenders
Association football midfielders
Sierra Leonean footballers
R.W.D. Molenbeek players
R. Charleroi S.C. players
Malatyaspor footballers
R.W.D.M. Brussels F.C. players
Willem II (football club) players
FC Baku players
Atlético Clube de Portugal players
Barkingside F.C. players
Thamesmead Town F.C. players
Welling United F.C. players
Dulwich Hamlet F.C. players
Eredivisie players
Belgian Pro League players
Challenger Pro League players
Sierra Leonean expatriate footballers
Expatriate footballers in the Netherlands
Sierra Leonean expatriate sportspeople in the Netherlands
Expatriate footballers in Belgium
Sierra Leonean expatriate sportspeople in Belgium
Expatriate footballers in Turkey
Sierra Leonean expatriate sportspeople in Turkey
Sportspeople from Freetown
Sierra Leone international footballers
Liga Portugal 2 players
Expatriate footballers in Portugal
Sportspeople involved in betting scandals
Match fixers
Sportspeople banned for life